Thunderball is the ninth studio album by German heavy metal band U.D.O. After their previous studio album, U.D.O. had released the DVD Nailed to Metal and an accompanying live CD titled Nailed to Metal: The Missing Tracks in 2003.

The title of this album and Udo Dirkschneider's posture on the cover are allusions to the 1965 film Thunderball.

Releases
 "Trainride in Russia" is devoted to the band's touring in that country. Its alternative version (with the subtitle "Poezd po Rossii") includes chorus lines in Russian:
Поезд по России идёт и идёт.
Поезд по России. 100 грамм и вперёд!
Перестук колёс. Необъятна даль.
Поезд нас унёс к началу всех начал.

 The limited edition release from AFM Records contains a bonus track along with the "Blind Eyes" music video and multimedia extras featuring a screensaver and wallpapers.
 The limited edition release from CD-Maximum contains the original album along with a DVD entitled Thundervision, featuring five video clips, an interview with Andreas Schowe from the German Metal Hammer magazine and four audio soundtracks.

Track listing

Personnel
U.D.O.
Udo Dirkschneider – vocals
Stefan Kaufmann – guitar, accordion on "Trainride in Russia", producer, engineer, mixing
Igor Gianola – guitar
Fitty Wienhold – bass
Lorenzo Milani – drums

Additional musicians
Frank Knight – backing vocals on "The Bullet and the Bomb"
Luke Herzog – cello on "Blind Eyes"

Production
Manfred Melchior – mastering
Martin Häusler – cover art, design
Dirk Schelpmeier – photography

Charts

References

2004 albums
U.D.O. albums
AFM Records albums